The L. Stockwell Jadwin Gymnasium is a 6,854-seat multi-purpose arena at Princeton University in Princeton, New Jersey. The arena opened in 1969. It is home to the Princeton Tigers college basketball teams.  It replaced Dillon Gymnasium, the home of Princeton volleyball and wrestling, as the fifth main basketball arena on campus.

In 1965, the mother of Leander Stockwell Jadwin, class of 1928, gave a gift of $27 million to the university in his name.  He had been the captain of the track team and had died just months after graduation in an automobile accident.  The school decided to use $6.5 million towards the building of the gymnasium, which had just barely been started.

The gymnasium, designed by the architect Walker O. Cain, has  of floor space on five levels for multiple sports. It is notable for its unique roof consisting of three interlocking shells. The seating is highly asymmetrical, with the equivalent of middle-school-gymnasium bleachers on three sides and a major-college indoor arena concrete grandstand on the fourth side, holding the majority of the seats.  Behind the opposite bleachers lies the void of the indoor track, which itself sits atop an indoor baseball field and three additional levels underneath. This creates challenges for generating noise and atmosphere even when the stands are full compared to other gyms in the Ivy League, which are mostly smaller and more traditional in their layout.  The television cameras also are mounted on the large grandstand side, which makes Jadwin seem much smaller on television.  Nonetheless, Princeton has a very strong historical record for home games.

Many of the highest attended events in Jadwin were College and High School Wrestling Tournaments, The 1975 NCAA Wrestling tournament drew a total of 45,000 (then the record) for six sessions, with 9.600 attending the finals. Six years later, Princeton brought in more temporary seating and averaged at least 1,000 more per session. For many years Jadwin Gymnasium was the site of the New Jersey State High School wrestling tournament, with many sessions of 8,000 to 10,000 fans.

Jadwin Gymnasium hosted games of the first round of the NCAA Division I men's basketball tournament twice, in 1970 and 1972. It was the site of the ECAC Metro Region tournament organized by the Eastern College Athletic Conference (ECAC) in 1976.

The Jadwin Jungle is the official student cheering section and basketball booster group in Jadwin Gymnasium for the Princeton Tigers basketball teams, located in the bleachers closest to the court behind the scorers' tables.  The cheering section was founded in 2003 by three Princeton undergraduates and quickly grew to be the largest student group on campus.

See also

 List of NCAA Division I basketball arenas

References

External links
 Jadwin Gymnasium, from Princeton.edu

College basketball venues in the United States
Princeton University buildings
Sports venues in New Jersey
Princeton Tigers men's basketball
Indoor arenas in New Jersey
Basketball venues in New Jersey
1969 establishments in New Jersey
Sports venues completed in 1969
College indoor track and field venues in the United States
Fencing venues
Squash venues in the United States
Tennis venues in New Jersey
Athletics (track and field) venues in New Jersey